In 2017, Reséndez won the Bancroft Prize in American History and Diplomacy for The Other Slavery: The Uncovered Story of Indian Enslavement in America.

Early life 
Reséndez grew up in Mexico City.

Education and career 
He received his Bachelor's degree in International relations at el Colegio de México in 1992 and worked in the Mexican government briefly around that time. In 1997, he received his Ph.D. in history at the University of Chicago. During his years as a graduate student, Reséndez served as a consultant for historical soap operas. He went on to teach at Yale University and University of Helsinki. He is currently a professor in the Department of History at the University of California, Davis.

Books

 Conquering the Pacific: An Unknown Mariner and the Final Great Voyage of the Age of Discovery, Houghton Mifflin Harcourt, 2021.
 The Other Slavery: The Uncovered Story of Indian Enslavement in America, Houghton Mifflin Harcourt, 2016.
 A Land So Strange: The Epic Journey of Cabeza de Vaca, Basic Books, 2007.
 Changing National Identities at the Frontier: Texas and New Mexico, 1800–1850, Cambridge University Press. 2005.
 A Texas Patriot on Trial in Mexico: José Antonio Navarro and the Texan Santa Fe Expedition, edited and translated with an introduction and notes by Andrés Reséndez. Dallas: DeGolyer Library/Clements Center for Southwest Studies, 2005.
 Caught Between Profits and Rituals: National Contestation in Texas and New Mexico, 1821–1848,  University of Chicago, 1997

See also
Slavery among the indigenous peoples of the Americas

References

External links 

 Andres Resendez on C-SPAN
 Faculty profile for University of California, Davis

University of California, Davis faculty
21st-century American historians
21st-century American male writers
Historians of the United States
Historians of Mexico
Historians of Texas
University of Chicago alumni
El Colegio de México alumni
Living people
Year of birth missing (living people)
Bancroft Prize winners
American male non-fiction writers